Arlit is a department of the Agadez Region in Niger. Its capital lies at the city of Arlit.
As of 2012, the department had a total population of 105,025 people.

Communes

It is divided administratively into the following communes:

Arlit
Dannet
Gougaram
Iferouane
Imouraren
Timia

References

Departments of Niger
Agadez Region